Didier Georgakakis (born 31 August 1966 in Lyon (Rhône)), is a French political scientist who specializes in the political sociology of the European Union.

He is a professor of Political Science and is the Jean Monnet Chair at the Department of Political Science of the University of Paris I - Panthéon-Sorbonne. He is also a member of the European Centre for Sociology and Political Science (CNRS/P1/EHESS). An honorary member of the Institut Universitaire de France, he has also been a visiting professor at the College of Europe in Bruges since 2007 and was appointed academic coordinator of the European General Studies programme in 2021.

References 

French political scientists
1966 births
Living people
Political sociologists